Aedh Dall Ua Conchobair, Prince of Connacht, died 1194.

Aedh was the eldest child of King Tairrdelbach Ua Conchobair (1088–1156). His mother's identity is uncertain - Tairrdelbach had six wives - but his full brothers were Tadhg Alainn (died 1143 or 1144) and Abbot Máel Ísa of Roscommon (died 1223).

Despite his seniority, Aedh's half-brother, Conchobar Ua Conchobair was favoured by their father. In 1135, during a political low-point in Tairrdelbach's career, Aedh, in concert with his half-brother Ruaidrí, staged a rebellion.

Their attempt failed. Ruaidrí was protected by the Archbishop of Connacht, but Aedh, together with his confederate Uada Ua Con Ceanainn, was blinded by Conchobair, and Dairmait Ua Mail Ruanaid.

He died in 1194. He was the father or uncle of Tommaltach Ua Conchobair, Archbishop of Armagh 1180 to 1201.

Annalistic references

 1136. Aedh, son of Toirdhealbhach Ua Conchobhair was blinded by Toirdhealbhach himself.
 1194.Hugh Dall (the Blind), the son of Turlough O'Conor, died. (from the Annals of the Four Masters)
 1136. Aedh, son of Toirdhelbhach Ua Conchobhair, was blinded by his own brother. (from the Annals of Lough Cé

References
 http://www.ucc.ie/celt/published/T100010A/index.html
 http://www.ucc.ie/celt/published/T100005B/index.html
 Irish Kings and High Kings, Francis John Byrne, 3rd revised edition, Dublin: Four Courts Press, 2001. 
 Early Irish kingship and succession, Bart Jaski, p. 139, 152n43, Four Courts Press, 2000
 Ruaidrí Ua Conchobair, in Medieval Ireland:An Encyclopedia, pp. 466–471, ed. Seán Duffy, New York City, 2005. .
 Ua Conchobair, Freya Verstraten, in Medieval Ireland:An Encyclopedia, pp. 466–471, ed. Seán Duffy, New York City, 2005. .

People from County Galway
Medieval Gaels from Ireland
12th-century Irish people